The Second Battle of Fort Fisher was a joint assault by Union Army and naval forces against the Confederate Fort Fisher, outside Wilmington, North Carolina, near the end of the American Civil War. Sometimes referred to as the "Gibraltar of the South" and the last major coastal stronghold of the Confederacy, Fort Fisher had tremendous strategic value during the war.  The Medal of Honor was awarded to 54 Union servicemen for their actions during this battle.

The Medal of Honor was created during the American Civil War and is the highest military decoration presented by the United States government to a member of its armed forces. The recipient must have distinguished themselves at the risk of their own life above and beyond the call of duty in action against an enemy of the United States. Due to the nature of this medal, it is commonly presented posthumously.

Recipients

Notes

References

 
 
 

Second Battle of Fort Fisher
Medal
North Carolina-related lists